Somsak Kiatsuranont (born 27 June 1954 in Khon Kaen) is a Thai politician of the Pheu Thai Party. He served as the Speaker of the House of Representatives of Thailand, also the President of the National Assembly of Thailand ex officio, from 3 August 2011 until 9 December 2013.

Education
Somsak Kiatsuranont studied engineering. He holds a bachelor's degree from Khon Kaen University, and a master's degree from Chulalongkorn University.

Political career
Somsak began his political career as a Member of Parliament representing Khon Kaen. In 1997, at the time a member of the New Aspiration Party, he was Vice Speaker of the House of Representatives. During this time, he acquired the nickname "The Hammer Man" ("ขุนค้อน") for his impartiality in presiding over the House's meetings and intensive use of the presidium's gavel. Later, he was a member of the Thai Rak Thai Party of Prime Minister Thaksin Shinawatra, which was banned after the 2006 coup d'etat, and transferred into the People's Power Party (PPP). In the PPP-led government of Samak Sundaravej, Somsak was Minister of Culture from August to September 2008, and Minister of Justice in Somchai Wongsawat's cabinet from September to December 2008. Then, the PPP suffered the same fate as the Thai Rak Thai, and was dissolved by the Constitutional Court, but was revived as the Pheu Thai Party, of which Somsak Kiatsuranont has been the vice chairman since September 2010.

After the Pheu Thai Party won the 2011 general election, Somsak Kiatsuranont was elected Speaker of the House of Representatives on 2 August 2011. Somsak who exercised restraint during the 2010 Thai political protests, is considered to be also acceptable for the parliamentary opposition. The Democrat Party did not field an opposing candidate. He was formally approved by the king on 3 August.

Honours
:
 Knight Grand Cordon (Special Class) of the Most Exalted Order of the White Elephant
 Knight Grand Cordon (Special Class) of the Most Noble Order of the Crown of Thailand

References

Somsak Kiatsuranont
Somsak Kiatsuranont
Somsak Kiatsuranont
Somsak Kiatsuranont
Somsak Kiatsuranont
Somsak Kiatsuranont
1954 births
Living people
Somsak Kiatsuranont
Somsak Kiatsuranont